Street Song is a 1935 British musical film directed by Bernard Vorhaus and starring John Garrick, René Ray and Wally Patch.

Plot
Pet shop owner Lucy (René Ray) befriends Tom (John Garrick), a busker who is mixed up with criminals. Lucy hopes to help him by getting him a singing job on the radio, while he tries to raise money to prevent her from being evicted, but any such hopes evaporate when Tom is arrested for robbery. Lucy's young brother, Billy (John Singer), comes to their aid by inadvertently prompting the real robber (Wally Patch) to confess, and Tom is freed to pursue his singing career.

Cast
 John Garrick as Tom Tucker  
 René Ray as Lucy  
 Wally Patch as Wally  
 Laurence Hanray as Tuttle  
 John Singer as Billy  
 George Cross as Roy Hall 
 Jack Vyvian as Detective

References

Bibliography
 Low, Rachael. Filmmaking in 1930s Britain. George Allen & Unwin, 1985.
 Wood, Linda. British Films, 1927-1939. British Film Institute, 1986.

External links

1935 films
British musical films
1935 musical films
Films directed by Bernard Vorhaus
Films shot at Twickenham Film Studios
Films set in England
British black-and-white films
1930s English-language films
1930s British films